The Boy That Time Forgot is a Big Finish Productions audio drama based on the long-running British science fiction television series Doctor Who.

Plot
The Doctor's past comes back to haunt him, when in a prehistoric jungle, inhabited by impossible creatures, an old friend of the Doctor awaits him.

Cast
The Doctor — Peter Davison
Nyssa — Sarah Sutton
The Scorpion King — Andrew Sachs
Mrs Beatrice Mapp — Harriet Walter
Rupert Von Thal — Adrian Scarborough
Kranlee — Oliver Senton
Madam Teegarna — Claire Wyatt

Continuity
This play follows on directly from the events of The Haunting of Thomas Brewster.
Many elements of Adric's first and last TV stories are referenced.  The Spiders seen in Full Circle are indirectly mentioned and the events at the end of Earthshock are directly mentioned.
Beatrice Mapp and Rupert Von Thal return in Magrs' non-Doctor Who novel The Bride That Time Forgot.

Cast notes
Adric is not played by Matthew Waterhouse
Andrew Sachs previously played Skagra in the Big Finish 2003 remake of Shada.

External links
Big Finish Productions – The Boy that Time Forgot

2008 audio plays
Fifth Doctor audio plays
Plays by Paul Magrs
Fiction set in 1868